The 2021–22 Arizona Wildcats men's basketball team represented the University of Arizona during the 2021–22 NCAA Division I men's basketball season. The team led by Tommy Lloyd, in his 1st season as a head coach. This was the Wildcats' 48th season at the on-campus McKale Center in Tucson, Arizona and 43rd season as a member of the Pac-12 Conference. They finished with a record of 33–4, 18–2 in Pac-12 play to win the regular season & Pac-12 tournament championship. During the season, Arizona was invited and participated in the Roman Main Event in Paradise, Nevada. Arizona defeated Wichita State and Michigan to finish in a championship game. In the postseason, Arizona defeated Stanford, and Colorado and UCLA in the championship game of the 2022 Pac-12 Conference men's basketball tournament in Paradise, Nevada, in their 8th overall. The Wildcats were invited and participated in the 2022 NCAA Division I men's basketball tournament, where they defeated Wright State and TCU in San Diego, California but lost to Houston in San Antonio, TX in the Sweet Sixteen.

Previous season
The Wildcats finished the 2020–21 season 17–9, 11–9 in Pac-12 play to finish in fifth place. Due to a self-imposed one-year NCAA ban, the Wildcats did not participate in the Pac-12 tournament or the NCAA tournament.

On April 7, 2021, after 12 seasons and amid the continuing corruption scandal, the school fired head coach Sean Miller.

Offseason

Coaching changes
Miller was fired on April 7, 2021, citing the program has incredibly high standards to have success on and off the court. Following Sean Miller's departure from Arizona, Arizona hired longtime Gonzaga assistant coach Tommy Lloyd.

Departures

Additions to staff

Transfers
Due to COVID-19, the NCAA ruled in October 2020 that the 2020–21 season would not count against the eligibility of any basketball player, thus giving all players the option to return in 2021–22. Additionally, any players who have declared for the 2021 NBA draft—including seniors, who must opt into this year's draft—have the option to return if they make a timely withdrawal from the draft and end any pre-draft relationships with agents. Thus, separate lists will initially be maintained for confirmed and potential departures.

Outgoing Transfers 

Incoming Transfers

2021 recruiting class
Shane Nowell, originally from Sammamish, WA, was the first commit of the 2021 recruiting class. He verbally committed to Arizona on October 31, 2020, over rival Montana, Montana State, Oklahoma & Washington. Nowell was a consensus four-star prospect out of Eastside Catholic in Sammamish, WA.

Adama Bal, from Paris, FR, was the third commit of the 2021 recruiting class. He verbally committed to Arizona on May 11, 2021, over Colorado, Cincinnati, Georgia, Marquette, San Francisco and Saint Mary's. Bal is out of INSEP Paris, France.

On April 24, 2021, Will Reeves announced that he would join the Wildcats as a preferred walk-on during the fall as a forward. On June 14, 2021, Addison Arnold announced that he would join the Wildcats as a preferred walk-on during the fall as a guard. On June 24, 2021, Benjamin Ackerley announced that he would join the Wildcats as a preferred walk-on during the fall as a guard.

2022 recruiting class

2023 recruiting class

Personnel

Roster

 
 
 
  

 
} 
 
 
 
 
  

Source:
 On December 8, senior forward Kim Aiken Jr. was out due to an undisclosed personal issue. A timeline for his return to the court for the 2021–22 season was undetermined at the time.
 Since February 23, Aiken has not been listed on the Arizona basketball roster.

Preseason

Lute Olson Tribute 
The University of Arizona & Men's basketball program held a public tribute at the McKale Center on September 12, 2021 for former head coach Lute Olson. The hall of fame coach spent 25 seasons at Arizona before retiring in 2008. Former players Steve Kerr, Jason Terry, Andre Iguodala & Matt Brase all spoke.

Red and Blue game 
The annual Red-Blue game took place at McKale Center on October 2, 2021. Christian Koloko, Bennedict Mathurin, Dalen Terry, and Ąžuolas Tubelis participated in the dunk contest, which was won by Terry with a perfect score of 120. The roster was split into two teams, Red versus Blue, with the Red team winning 53−39. Aiken Jr., led the team with 20 points, going 8-for-10 from the field and 4-for-4 from the three with four rebounds. Azuolas Tubelis had 14 points, going 7-for-7 with seven rebounds and two assists. Mathurin scored 16 points, shooting 6-for-12 from the field and 3-for-4 from the free throw line. Koloko finished with 10 points, four rebounds, and four blocks.

Preseason rankings
Arizona received a T-4th with Oregon State in the PAC-12 Preseason poll.
Arizona received 26 votes in the AP poll but was ranked outside the top 25.
Arizona received 8 votes in the Coaches Poll but was ranked outside the top 25.

Preseason awards watchlists
 Bennedict Mathurin ― Jerry West Award Watch List
 Ąžuolas Tubelis ― Karl Malone Award Watch List

Preseason All Pac-12 teams

 Bennedict Mathurin ― 1st Team
 Ąžuolas Tubelis  ― 2nd Team

Schedule and results
The Wildcats finalized their schedule in the summer, dates and times were be finalized in the fall. Arizona will host Cal Baptist, NAU, Northern Colorado, North Dakota State, Sacramento State, Texas–Rio Grande Valley, Wyoming at McKale Center in Tucson, AZ. Arizona played the 2021 Roman Main Event in Las Vegas with Michigan, UNLV & Wichita State. They played two true road against Illinois & Tennessee, that were canceled the previous season (including not play against Gonzaga in the 2021–22 season The Pac-12 will continue with its 20-game conference schedule, with 10 home & away games per school. Arizona will not play against Washington State at home and Oregon on the road.

|-
!colspan=12 style=| Exhibition
 
|-
!colspan=12 style=| Regular season

 

 

  

  

 
 
 

 
|-
!colspan=12 style=| Pac-12 tournament

|-
!colspan=12 style=| NCAA tournament

Pac-12 tournament
In the Pac-12 tournament as a #1-seed, They faced off against #9-seed Stanford, defeated 84-80 in the quarterfinals. They faced off against #4-seed Colorado, defeated 82-72 in the semifinals. They faced off against #2-seed UCLA defeated 84-76 in the title game to win their 8th Pac-12 conference tournament title in Paradise, Nevada.

NCAA tournament
Arizona entered the NCAA tournament as a #1-seed (South Region), facing off against #16-seed Wright State, Arizona won 87–70. Furthermore, Arizona’s victory against Wright State marked their first win in the NCAA tournament since 2017. In the round of 32, Arizona faced off against #9-seed TCU, Arizona won 85–80 in the overtime thriller. In the sweet sixteen, Arizona faced off against #5-seed Houston but losing 60–72, ending their season.

Game Summaries
This section will be filled in as the season progresses. 

Source:

Northern Arizona

Texas–Rio Grande Valley

North Dakota State

vs Wichita State

vs No. 4 Michigan

Sacramento State

at Oregon State

Wyoming

at Illinois

Northern Colorado

California Baptist

at Tennessee

Washington

Colorado

Utah

at Stanford

at California

at UCLA

Arizona State

UCLA

USC

at Arizona State

at Washington State

at Washington

Oregon State

Oregon

at Utah

at Colorado

at USC

Stanford

California

Stanford (Pac-12 Quarterfinal)

Colorado (Pac-12 Semifinal)

UCLA (Pac-12 Final)

Wright State (round of 64)

TCU (round of 32)

Houston (Sweet 16)

Rankings

*AP does not release post-NCAA tournament rankings^Coaches did not release a Week 2 poll.

Player statistics

Awards & milestones

Season highs

Players 
Points: A. Tubelis, 32 (Utah)
Rebounds: C. Koloko, 13 (Arizona State , California & Wright State)
Assists: K. Kriisa, 10 (Colorado & Utah)
Steals: B. Mathurin & D. Terry, 5 (Northern Colorado, TCU & Wyoming)
Blocks: O. Ballo, 6 (UCLA)
Minutes: D. Terry, 42 (TCU)

Team 
Points: 105, (Sacramento State)
Field goals: 39, (Northern Colorado)
Field Goal Attempts: 75 (UCLA)
3 Point Field goals Made: 13, (North Dakota State)
3 Point Field goals Attempts: 32, (Oregon State)
Free throws Made: 29, (Wichita State)
Free throws Attempts: 42, (Wichita State)
Rebounds: 54, (Texas–Rio Grande Valley)
Assists: 31, (Sacramento State)
Steals: 13, (Oregon State)
Blocked Shots: 12, (Cal Baptist)
Turnovers: 22, (Wichita State)
Fouls: 28, (Tennessee)

Weekly Awards

Bennedict Mathurin

Pac-12 Men's Basketball Player of the Week 4 (Dec. 6)
Pac-12 Men's Basketball Player of the Week 5 (Dec. 13)
Pac-12 Men's Basketball Player of the Week 15 (Feb. 21)
NCAA March Madness Player of the Week 5 (Dec. 13)
Oscar Robertson National Player of the Week (Dec. 13)
 
Christian Koloko

Pac-12 Men's Basketball Player of the Week 2 (Nov. 22)

Ąžuolas Tubelis

Pac-12 Men's Basketball Player of the Week 13 (Feb. 7)

Midseason awards watchlists 
Bennedict Mathurin
John R. Wooden Award Top 10 Watch List

Christian Koloko
Naismith Defensive Player of the Year Award Watch List

Ąžuolas Tubelis
Karl Malone Award Top 10 Watch List

Final awards watchlists 
Tommy Lloyd
Naismith Coach of the Year Late season top 15

Christian Koloko
Naismith Defensive Player of the Year Award Semifinalists

Bennedict Mathurin
John R. Wooden Award Late Season Top 20 Watch List
Jerry West Award Top 5 Finalist
Naismith Player of the Year Midseason top 30

Postseason awards and Pac-12 honors
Bennedict Mathurin
 Pac-12 Player of the Year
 All―Pac-12 First Team
 Pac-12 tournament Most Outstanding Player
 Pac-12 All-Tournament Team
 NABC District 19 First Team

Christian Koloko
 Pac-12 Defensive Player of the Year
 Pac-12 Most Improved Player of the Year
 All―Pac-12 First Team
 All―Pac-12 Defensive First Team
 Pac-12 All-Tournament Team
 NABC District 19 Second Team

Pelle Larsson
 Pac-12 6th Man of The Year

Dalen Terry 
 All―Pac-12 Honorable Mention
 All―Pac-12 Defensive First Team

Ąžuolas Tubelis
 All―Pac-12 First Team
 NABC District 19 First Team

Tommy Lloyd
 Pac-12 Coach of the Year
 NABC District 19 Coach of the Year

National awards
Bennedict Mathurin
 2022 Associated Press 2nd team All-American
 2022 National Association of Basketball Coaches 2nd team All-American
 2022 Sporting News 2nd team All-American
 2022 United States Basketball Writers Association 2nd team All-American

Tommy Lloyd
 2022  AP Coach of the Year
 2022 NABC Coach of the Year
 2022 USBWA Coach of the Year

See also
2021–22 Arizona Wildcats women's basketball team

References

2021-22
Arizona
2021 in sports in Arizona
2022 in sports in Arizona
Arizona